Garret Ahearn is an Irish Fine Gael politician who has been a Senator for the Administrative Panel since April 2020.  He is the Fine Gael Seanad Spokesperson on Enterprise and Trade. 

Prior to becoming a Senator, he was a member of Tipperary County Council from 2019 to 2020. John Fitzgerald was co-opted to Ahearn's seat on Tipperary County Council following his election to the Seanad. He was Mayor of Clonmel from 2019 to 2020.  

He unsuccessfully contested the Tipperary constituency at the 2020 general election. 

He is the son of Theresa Ahearn, who served as a Fine Gael TD for the Tipperary South constituency from 1989 to 2000.

References

External links
Garret Ahearn's page on the Fine Gael website

Living people
Fine Gael senators
Members of the 26th Seanad
People from County Tipperary
Local councillors in County Tipperary
Year of birth missing (living people)